Dysspastus hartigi is a moth of the family Autostichidae. It is found in Italy.

References

Moths described in 1977
Dysspastus
Moths of Europe